Friedrich Eibner (1826–1877), a German painter of architectural subjects, was born at Hilpoltstein. He studied after the works of Heinrich Schönfeld, and travelled in Bavaria, and afterwards in Germany, France, Upper Italy, and Spain, making a large number of water-colour drawings of the places he visited. The Album for the Prince Metschersky, with whom he travelled in Spain in 1860–61, may be considered his best work. He died at Munich in 1877.

See also
 List of German painters

References
 

1826 births
1877 deaths
19th-century German painters
19th-century German male artists
German male painters
People from Roth (district)